François Bonneau (born 12 October 1953) is a French educationalist, politician, and incumbent President of the Regional Council of Centre-Val de Loire. He is a member of the Socialist Party.

He has served as
a representative member of the Montargis municipal council (1983–2008) 
a representative member of the Centre-Val de Loire regional council (since 1998) 
vice-president of the regional council (2004–2007), 
president of the council since 2007 (taking over from Michel Sapin following the resignation of the latter, then being elected for a full term in that role in his own right in March 2010).

References

Living people
1953 births
Presidents of the Regional Council of Centre-Val de Loire
Members of the Regional Council of Centre-Val de Loire
Politicians from Centre-Val de Loire
Socialist Party (France) politicians
21st-century French politicians
University of Orléans alumni
People from Loiret